Sania Mirza was the defending champion, but decided not to participate this year.

Noppawan Lertcheewakarn won the title defeating Kristina Mladenovic in the final 7–5, 6–4.

Seeds

Draw

Finals

Top half

Bottom half

References
 Main Draw
 Qualifying Draw

Al Habtoor Tennis Challenge - Singles
Al Habtoor Tennis Challenge
2011 in Emirati tennis